Combretastatin A-1 is a combretastatin and a stilbenoid. It can be found in Combretum caffrum, the Eastern Cape South African Bushwillow tree.

Biological effects in mammals
It is an antiangiogenic agent acting by destabilizing tubulin, which induces cell apoptosis of proliferating endothelial cells.

Derivatives as drugs
Currently designated an orphan drug by the FDA, combretastatin A1 diphosphate (OXi4503 or CA1P) is in Phase I clinical trials for relapsed and refractory acute myeloid leukemia and myelodysplastic syndrome.

References 

Combretastatins
Stilbenoids